Francis Harrison may refer to:

Francis Burton Harrison (1873–1957), American statesman; U.S. Representative
Francis Capel Harrison (1863–1938), British Member of Parliament for Kennington, 1922–1923
Francis James Harrison (1912–2004), American Roman Catholic bishop

See also
Frances Harrison (born 1966), British journalist
Frank Harrison (politician) (1940–2009), Democratic member of the U.S. House of Representatives from Pennsylvania